The European Rowing Championships is an international Rowing regatta organised by FISA (the International Rowing Federation) for European rowing nations, plus Israel which, though not a member of the European federation is treated as a European nation for competition purposes.

The championships date back to 1893, the year after FISA was founded. Over time, the competition grew in status and as it was not restricted to European countries, became regarded as the quasi-world championships. The World Rowing Championships were commenced in 1962 and the last European Championships were held in 1973 as from 1974, the World Championships became an annual event. The European Championships were re-introduced in 2007 but with a narrower focus on Europe.

History

The first regatta held as a European Rowing Championships was held in 1893 and these continued annually until 1913; the 1914 to 1919 events did not occur due to World War I. The annual schedule was next interrupted in 1928 when the Amsterdam Olympics were regarded as a replacement event; the 1920 Antwerp Olympics or the 1924 Paris Olympics had previously not been a reason for skipping the European Championships. The next time the Olympics were held in Europe, i.e. the 1936 Berlin Olympics, again saw the European Championships skipped. World War II saw the 1939 to 1946 regattas cancelled. The next European event was held in 1947, with subsequent years skipped due to Europe-based Olympics in 1948 (London) and 1952 (Helsinki).

The 1951 European Rowing Championships is notable as the first test event for international women's rowing organised by the International Rowing Federation (FISA). Regattas continued under that name until 1973. From 1962, the event was replaced (one year in four) by the World Rowing Championships, which then became an annual event from 1974. Women's events were introduced in 1954, the first international races for women, but even then men's and women's events were held on different days, and in some years at different venues.

On 27 May 2006 the FISA members voted to re-introduce a separate European Rowing Championships in its own right.

In the first regatta there were only three events (men's single, coxed four and eight) and only ten entries. Races were 3,000 m long, except for singles – which were only 2,000 m. Coxed pair was first raced in the following year and double scull was added in 1898. Coxless pair was added in 1924 and coxless four was added the year after. The next change after that was the inclusion of women's rowing.

In 2007, when the European Rowing Championship was re-introduced, there were 14 Olympic boat classes racing over 2,000m. Historically the leading European nations, notably Great Britain and Germany, had taken a haphazard approach to attending the championships. Following the 2012 Summer Olympics, however, both fully committed to the event going forward, and from that date, the championships have progressed rapidly to represent one of the key events in world rowing; given the historic and modern strength of European rowing, they rank behind only the Olympic Games, World Championships and World Cup Series. In Olympic years, when World Championships are not held, they provide a key test ahead of the Olympic regatta, in addition to a significant competitive opportunity in their own right.

In 2015, European Rowing announced that the 2018 edition of the championships would form part of the first European Championships, a co-branded multi-sport event organised by, and consisting of the European championships of, the individual European sports federations.

Editions
The first regatta held as a European Rowing Championships was held in 1893.

All-time medal table 
Total of medals from 1893 to 2020. Alsace-Lorraine won one gold, three silvers and nine bronzes which are added to Germany's total medals.

See also
 European Rowing U23 Championships

References

External links
 Official FISA homepage
 

 
Rowing in Europe
European championships
Rowing competitions
Recurring sporting events established in 1893
Recurring sporting events established in 2007
1893 establishments in Europe